Raj Thota is an Indian Telugu-Language film cinematographer. He received praise for the film Arjun Reddy.

Early life
Raj was born in the Kasarabad village, grew up in Suryapet, Nalgonda, Telangana, and moved to Hyderabad. He was very enthusiastic in building teams to play village-level cricket and kabaddi, from a very young age. His mother, Mani Thota, is a house wife, while his father, the late Venkat Thota, was a makeup artist for Telugu films, mainly doing make-up for Mohan Babu. He showed keen interest in photography since an early age.

Career

Early years and it Follows (2000-2014)
Raj’s father Venkat Thota was a make up artist with Mohan Babu and Raj used to accompany his father to the sets during holidays. It was during those visits Raj thought that the director, cinematographer, and lead actors are the only people, who were busy and running hither and thither. So, he decided to choose among these three crafts, and ultimately chose to be a cinematographer. He expressed his desire to his father and joined his colleague, T. Surendra Reddy, a cinematographer, where he worked for different genres of films for several years, including Hindi films directed by Mani Shankar, in Hyderabad.

Later, he worked under DOP Mohana Krishna, as an assistant, in Hindi films, such as Ishqiya, R... Rajkumar, Do Lafzon Ki Kahani, and Force 2. He also worked in several commercials, as a second unit cameraman.
 He later did a lot of ‘clash work’ for fellow cinematographer, Sai Sriram, for his films, when he was not available to shoot. These included  Geethanjali, Ra Ra... Krishnayya, and Cinema Choopistha Mava. He also did the same for Pellichoopulu.

In 2016, director Sandeep Vanga gave him the opportunity to debut as the cinematographer for Vijay Devarakonda's film Arjun Reddy, which was a huge runaway hit, the winner of the Best Actor in the 65th Filmfare Awards South and Santhosham Award, to the best debut cinematographer. His later films were Needi Naadi Oke Katha in 2018 and Husharu in 2019. Raj was hired by director Puri Jagannadh to be the DOP for the action film, iSmart Shankar.

Arjun Reddy
Raj made his debut as cinematographer with the movie, Arjun Reddy. For the 4 min single shot of following an actor from exterior to interior Raj Practised with Gimbal rig for one full day before executing the shot. Shots of the Bike sequence shot with Gimbal rig and close ups in Arjun Reddy were well appreciated.

Continued success (2017–present)
After finishing Arjun Reddy, Raj was hired to shoot director Venu Udugula's (in his directorial debut) 2018 film Needi Naadi Oke Katha. Venu and Raj decided to adapt Dogme 95 school of thought. (The rules to create film making based on the traditional values of story, acting, and theme, and excluding the use of elaborate special effects or technology. It was an attempt to take back power for the director as artist as opposed to the studio) Raj had to device lengthy shots, candid style and more of an available light style, with limited crew adhering to Dogme 95 school of thought. He collaborated with Producer Bekkam Venugopal to shoot Husharu much before Needi Naadi Oke Katha being theatrically released in both the Telugu states on 23 March 2018.
In Husharu film for Undiporaadey pathos version song, he designed a Body rig to be mounted on actors to get the particular mood of the song.

Filmography

References

External links 
 

People from Nalgonda
Living people
Cinematographers from Telangana
Telugu film cinematographers
Year of birth missing (living people)